Goh Choon Huat (born 14 December 1990) is a Singaporean former cyclist, who competed as a professional from 2012 to 2022.

Major results

2011
 2nd Road race, National Road Championships
2012
 National Road Championships
2nd Road Race
2nd Time trial
2016
 1st  Time trial, National Road Championships
2017
 1st  Road race, National Road Championships
2018
 National Road Championships
1st  Road race
1st  Time trial
2019
 National Road Championships
1st  Road race
1st  Time trial
 2nd Overall Tour de Filipinas
 Southeast Asian Games
3rd Time trial
3rd Road race
 5th Overall Tour of Peninsular
2020
 4th Overall Cambodia Bay Cycling Tour
2022
 National Road Championships
1st  Time trial
2nd Road race
 Southeast Asian Games
6th Time trial
8th Road race

References

External links

1990 births
Living people
Singaporean male cyclists
Competitors at the 2019 Southeast Asian Games
Southeast Asian Games medalists in cycling
Southeast Asian Games bronze medalists for Singapore
Singaporean sportspeople of Chinese descent